Chen Guokang (born 23 January 1999) is a Chinese professional footballer currently playing as a midfielder for Chinese Super League club Meizhou Hakka.

Club career
Chen Guokang would play for the Guangzhou Evergrande youth team as a midfielder before being selected for the Chinese youth teams were he was moved into defence as a full-back. On 20 April 2020, Chen joined second tier football club Meizhou Hakka. He would make his debut on 13 September 2020 in a league game against Liaoning Shenyang Urban in a 2-0 victory, where the Head coach Marcelo Rospide pushed Chen back into midfield. Playing as a attacking midfielder, Chen would soon go on to score his first goal against Jiangxi Liansheng on 20 September 2020 in a league game that ended in a 4-0 victory. The following season would see Chen go on to establish himself as a vital member of the team that gained promotion to the top tier after coming second within the division at the end of the 2021 China League One campaign.

International career
On 20 July 2022, Chen made his international debut in a 3-0 defeat against South Korea in the 2022 EAFF E-1 Football Championship, as the Chinese FA decided to field the U-23 national team for this senior competition.

Career statistics
.

References

External links

1999 births
Living people
Footballers from Zhanjiang
Footballers from Guangdong
Chinese footballers
China youth international footballers
Association football defenders
China League One players
Guangzhou F.C. players
Meizhou Hakka F.C. players